Vazhvanthol waterfalls is located near Vithura, around 46 km from Thiruvananthapuram on the way to Bonacad.

References

 https://roughroads.com/vazhvanthol-hidden-treasure-trivandrum/

External links

Waterfalls of Kerala
Geography of Thiruvananthapuram district